The Switzerland men's national under-18 basketball team is a national basketball team of Switzerland, administered by the Swiss Basketball. It represents the country in men's international under-18 basketball competitions.

Toni Rocak who later played in the US-based NCAA and also became a member of Switzerland's senior team is a notable former member.

FIBA U18 European Championship participations

See also
Switzerland men's national basketball team
Switzerland men's national under-16 basketball team
Switzerland women's national under-18 basketball team

References

External links
Official website 
Archived records of Switzerland team participations

Basketball teams in Switzerland
Basketball
Men's national under-18 basketball teams